At the 1932 Winter Olympics, four Nordic skiing events were contested – two cross-country skiing events, one ski jumping event, and one nordic combined event.

References
1932 Lake Placid Winter Games. Sports Reference. Retrieved 2020-04-12.

1932 Winter Olympics events
1932